The Ra'ad-II ("thunder-2") missile is a Pakistani long-range ALCM which is derived from the Ra'ad ALCM. It was first publicly unveiled on the Pakistan Day military parade on 23 March 2017, 
The missile's range steadily increased from its initial 300 km to its most recent test's 600 km, and its guidance and flight control systems were also enhanced.

Testing and unveiling
On 18 February the missile was test-fired from a PAF Dassault Mirage III Fighter aircraft, the testing was seen by Strategic Plans Division director general lieutenant general Nadeem Zaki Manj, the chairman of NESCOM Nabeel Hayat Malik as well as senior officers from the Strategic Plans Division, Strategic Forces and Strategic Organizations of Pakistan. According to the ISPR, it significantly enhanced Pakistan's air delivered strategic standoff capability on land and at sea.

Characteristics
According to the ISPR, the new missile has a range of 600 km. The Ra'ad-II missile has a conventional tail fin configuration compared to the twin tail configuration of the previous version. It has a new "X" type tail as opposed to previous versions large horizontal tails. The missile is also seen to have a length of 4.85 m, further information about the missile has been kept classified.

Similar missiles
AGM-158 JASSM (USA)
CJ-10 (China)
KEPD 350 (Germany/Sweden)
Kh-65SE (Russia)
SOM (Turkey)
Storm Shadow (France/UK)

References 

Cruise missiles of Pakistan
Air-to-surface missiles of Pakistan
2020 in Pakistan
Air-launched missiles
Weapons and ammunition introduced in 2020